Galina Melnik (born 27 April 1970) is a former female table tennis player from Russia. She won a gold medal in the Women's Team event at the Table Tennis World Cup in 1994.

References

Living people
Russian female table tennis players
Table tennis players at the 2000 Summer Olympics
Table tennis players at the 2004 Summer Olympics
Table tennis players at the 1992 Summer Olympics
Olympic table tennis players of Russia
Olympic table tennis players of the Unified Team
1970 births
20th-century Russian women
21st-century Russian women